Terengganu (Terengganu Malay: Tranung,), formerly spelled Trengganu or Tringganu, is a sultanate and constitutive state of federal Malaysia. The state is also known by its Arabic honorific, Dāru l-Īmān ("Abode of Faith"). The coastal city of Kuala Terengganu, which stands at the mouth of the broad Terengganu River, is both the state and royal capital as well as the largest city in Terengganu. There are many islands located close to the coast of Terengganu state, such as Perhentian Islands and Redang Island.

Etymology
There are several theories on the origin of the name "Terengganu". One theory attributes the name's origin to terang ganu, Malay for 'bright rainbow'. Another story, said to have been originally narrated by the ninth Sultan of Terengganu, Baginda Omar, tells of a party of hunters from Pahang roving and hunting in the area of what is now southern Terengganu. One of the hunters spotted a big animal fang lying on the ground. A fellow party member asked to which animal did the fang belong. The hunter, not knowing which animal, simply answered taring anu (Malay: 'fang of something'). The party later returned to Pahang with a rich hoard of game, fur and sandalwood, which impressed their neighbours. They asked the hunters where did they source their riches, to which they replied, from the land of taring anu, which later evolved into Terengganu. Terengganu was called Trangkanu by the Siamese when it was under their influence. Terengganuans usually pronounce Terengganu as Tranung or Ganu with the G often being emphasized.

Chinese naming
The traditional Chinese name for Terengganu has been "丁加奴" (Pinyin: dīngjiānú), which is a direct transcription of the Malay name. However, in recent years, the Chinese community in Terengganu has raised objections to the name, citing that the characters used loosely translate to "giving birth to a child who will become a slave" (Chinese: 添丁加做奴). Therefore, they successfully petitioned the regulatory commission for Chinese language in Malaysia to change the Chinese name for the state to "登嘉楼" (Pinyin: dēngjiālóu),  which can be loosely translated to "aspiring/stepping up to a higher level", in September 2004. It is worth noting, however, that the new name was in unofficial use by the state's Chinese community for at least 30 years before its official adoption.

Certain segments of the Chinese community opposed the name change, citing the fact that the new name contains too many character strokes, making it much more difficult to write. They have proposed to revert the name to the version used before 2004, but with the word "奴" (slave, which was mainly the cause of the controversy) to the similar sounding, but more positive "努" (perseverance).

History

Hindu-Buddhist Era
Terengganu's location by the South China Sea ensured that it was on trade routes since ancient times. The earliest written reports on the area that is now Terengganu were by Chinese merchants and seafarers in the early 6th century A.D. Like other Malay states, Terengganu practised a Hindu–Buddhist culture combined with animist traditional beliefs for hundreds of years before the arrival of Islam. Under the influence of Srivijaya, Terengganu traded extensively with the Majapahit Empire, the Khmer Empire and especially the Chinese.

Medieval Era 
Terengganu was the first Malay state to receive Islam, as attested to by the Terengganu Inscription Stone with Arabic inscriptions found in Kuala Berang, the capital of the district of Hulu Terengganu.  The inscribed date which is incomplete due to damage can be read as various dates from 702 to 789 AH (1303 to 1387 CE). Terengganu became a vassal state of Malacca, but retained considerable autonomy with the emergence of Johor Sultanate.

Terengganu emerged as an independent sultanate in 1724. The first sultan was Tun Zainal Abidin, the younger brother of a former sultan of Johor, and Johor strongly influenced Terengganu politics through the 18th century. However, in the book Tuhfat al-Nafis, the author, Raja Ali Haji, mentions that in the year 1708, Tun Zainal Abidin was installed as the Sultan of Terengganu by Daeng Menampuk - also known as Raja Tua - under the rule of Sultan Sulaiman Badrul Alam Shah.

In the 19th century, Terengganu became a vassal state of the Thai Rattanakosin Kingdom, and sent tribute every year called bunga mas. This occurred under the reign of Sultan Omar Riayat Shah, who was remembered as a devout ruler who promoted trade and stable government. Terengganu prospered, and was largely left alone by the authorities in Bangkok unlike in neighbouring Patani and Kelantan. The period also witnessed the existence of a Terengganuan vassal of Besut Darul Iman.

Modern Era
The terms of the Anglo-Siamese Treaty of 1909 saw power over Terengganu transferred from Siam to Great Britain. A British advisor was appointed to the sultan in 1919, and Terengganu become one of the Unfederated Malay States. The move was highly unpopular locally, and in 1928 the British used military force to suppress a popular uprising.

During World War II, Japan occupied Terengganu and transferred sovereignty over the state back to Siam, which had been renamed Thailand in 1939, along with Kelantan, Kedah, and Perlis. After the defeat of Japan, British control over these Malay states was reestablished. Terengganu became a member of the Federation of Malaya in 1948, then a state of a sovereign Malaya in 1957, which became Malaysia in 1963.

Following decades of rule by the Barisan Nasional coalition, the Pan-Malaysian Islamic Party (PAS) came to power in 1999, making Terengganu the second state in Malaysia to be ruled by the Islamist party (the first being neighbouring Kelantan). Terengganu was recaptured in the 2004 Malaysian general election by the Barisan Nasional, which continued to govern it until the 2018 Malaysian general election.

Geography

Terengganu is situated in eastern Peninsular Malaysia, and is bordered in the northwest by Kelantan, the southwest by Pahang, and the east by the South China Sea. Several outlying islands, including Pulau Perhentian, Pulau Kapas and Pulau Redang, are also a part of the state.

Politics and government

Constitution
The Constitution of Terengganu came into force in 1911. It has a supplement that came into force in 1959. The official English title for the 1911 constitution is "The Constitution of the Way of Illustrious Sovereignty". The 1959 constitutional supplement is divided into two sections. The sections' official English language titles are "The Laws of the Constitution of Terengganu (First Part)" and "The Laws of the Constitution of Terengganu (Second Part)"

The Sultan of Terengganu

The Sultan is the constitutional ruler of the state of Terengganu. The State Constitution proclaims that the Sultan is "the Ruler and fountain head of all authority of government in the State and Territory of Terengganu", the Head of the Religion of Islam in the state and the source of all titles, honours and dignities in the state. He is also vested with the Executive Power of the State. The hereditary Sultan of Terengganu since 1998 has been Sultan Mizan Zainal Abidin.

Regency
As per both the Malaysian and state constitutions, the Yang di-Pertuan Agong or King of Malaysia cannot simultaneously reign as federal Head of State and ruler of his own state. This means that a state ruler must appoint a regent to govern in his absence. Between 2006 and 2011, the current Sultan served as the 13th King of Malaysia, naming his eldest son and heir apparent, Tengku Muhammad Ismail, as Regent (Pemangku Raja) of Terengganu. As he was only eight years old upon his father's election, the young Prince co-reigned with a three-member Regency Advisory Council (Majlis Penasihat Pemangku Raja) headed by Raja Tengku Baderulzaman (the King's younger brother) as dictated by syarat (2) Fasal 16 AA Undang-Undang Bagi Diri Kerajaan Terengganu (Bab Yang Kedua) of the Terengganu State Constitution.

Chief Ministers 

When Terengganu was an absolute monarchy, the Chief Minister was selected by the Sultan. Since the declaration of independence of Malaysia (then called Tanah Melayu) and the first general election, the Chief Minister has been the State Assembly (ADUN) member elected by a majority of all State Assembly members, who are themselves elected by universal adult suffrage of the citizens of their constituencies. Below is the list of the Chief Ministers of Terengganu from 1925.

Note:* The state Government formed by PAS after the general election in 1959 was turned over to Perikatan in Nov 1961, due to a vote of no confidence in the State Assembly and the fact that two PAS assemblymen switched parties

2008 Menteri Besar appointment crisis

Following the ruling party UMNO's return to power over Terengganu after winning 24 out of 32 seats in the 2008 general elections, Prime Minister (PM) Abdullah Ahmad Badawi put forth the reappointment of Datuk Seri Idris Jusoh to a second term as Menteri Besar. In what political analysts described as a possible constitutional crisis, trouble began to precipitate after the Sultan of Terengganu, Tuanku Mizan Zainal Abidin, who is also the then Yang di-Pertuan Agong (King) of Malaysia refused to re-appoint and swear in Idris as Menteri Besar. Similar problems occurred in the state of Perlis where the PM's choice was also rejected, in which the latter eventually gave in to its Sultan.

The Sultan of Terengganu appointed Ahmad Said instead for the job, with the Regency Advisory Council handing him the letter of appointment. The PM claimed that the appointment of Ahmad Said was unconstitutional as it went against the wishes of the assemblymen and the Prime Minister's office who have supported Idris Jusoh candidacy for Menteri Besar.

In spite of threats to strip Ahmad Said of his party membership "for disobeying the leadership", he went to the office in Wisma Darul Iman to begin the first day of his new appointment on 25 March 2008. The party announced earlier that they made good on their promise to remove his membership, which technically disqualifies him to be appointed as Menteri Besar in the first place. The ruling also planned to vote down the sultan's choice through a motion of no-confidence by 22 UMNO state assemblymen.

The opposition party Parti Islam SeMalaysia in the meantime promised that its assemblymen would support Ahmad Said as Menteri Besar.

On 26 March 2008 however, PM Abdullah Ahmad Badawi and Sultan Mizan Zainal Abidin met at Istana Negara to resolve the deadlock. The Prime Minister reversed his stance and decided to accept the King's appointment of Ahmad Said as Chief Minister of Terengganu. He also apologised to the King for the public spat over the appointment of the Menteri Besar, explaining that there was no intention to disparage or humiliate the royal household.

The apparent backdown was due to threat that the royal household would be prepared to dissolve the state assembly if the motion of no-confidence was initiated against Ahmad Said, which would trigger another election in what is already a climate of discontent towards the ruling party and the possibility of dissenting assemblymen defecting to the opposition.

The UMNO Supreme Council proceeded to endorse Ahmad Said as the new Menteri Besar of Terengganu. With the resolution of the impasse, Ahmad Said expressed his gratefulness on his appointment and paid tribute to Idris, an old friend he has known since university, for the work he has done for the Terengganu people so far and to seek his advice. After the swearing in ceremony where the duties are handed over from Idris, he also expressed hopes in moving on to discharge his responsibility to the people and eradicate poverty within the state.

Administrative divisions 

Terengganu is divided into 8 districts (daerah), 99 mukims, and 7 local governments.

On 18 September 2014, it was announced that the Kuala Terengganu District sub-district of Kuala Nerus would become Terengganu's 8th district, to be called Kuala Nerus by former Prime Minister Najib Razak.

Demographics

Terengganu has a population of 1,015,776 , which increase to 1,149,440 in 2020. In 2006, Malays make up 94.7% of the population and Chinese, 2.6%, while Indians 0.2% and other ethnic groups comprise the remainder, 2.4%. According to the 2010 census, the ethnic composition of Terengganu is 97% Bumiputras, 2.6% Chinese, 0.2% Indian, and 0.1% others.

In 2000, the state's population was only 48.7% urban; the majority lived in rural areas. By the 2005 census, the proportions had changed significantly, with 51% of the population living in urban areas and 49% in the rural areas.

Ethnic groups

Terengganu is one of Malaysia's most homogeneous states along with Kelantan. More than 95% of the population is ethnically Malay, but there are other ethnic groups that live in the state as well including Chinese (mostly Hokkien), Indians (mostly Tamils), Siamese and Orang Aslis (Batek and Semaq Beri).

Malays
Malays are the largest ethnic group in the state with more than 94% of the population. The Malays in Terengganu are distinct from Malays of other parts of the country, they have unique cultures, traditions and spoken language. There are two sub-groups of Malays in the state:

Terengganu Malays

Terengganu Malays are the majority Malay sub-group in the state. They are the dominant Malay sub-group in all districts of Terengganu except for Besut and northern Setiu. They habitually speak Terengganu Malay language which is distinct but closely related to Kelantanese variety in the north. Terengganu Malays are also known for their rich cultures and traditions, one of the most well known is the Ulek Mayang.

Besut Malays

Besut Malays are predominantly found in the district of Besut and northern Setiu. Despite being Terengganu citizens, they are ethnically, linguistically and culturally closer to, and still maintain strong ties with, Kelantan. Most Malays in Besut and northern Setiu speaks only Kelantanese, although those who have long been exposed to other districts of Terengganu can speak Terengganuan as well.

Chinese
The Chinese Terengganuan form the largest minority ethnic group in the state. They are mostly Hokkien by ancestry and speak a dialect of Hokkien. Unlike other parts of Malaysia, the Chinese in Terengganu are much more assimilated; they speak fluent local Malay (Terengganuan in most parts of Terengganu and Kelantanese in Besut) and also share a similar lifestyle. They also have a local Peranakan culture known as "Mek Awang" which is a mixture of Chinese (mostly Hokkien) and Malay (Terengganu Malay) cultures, which can be seen in their cuisine and clothing and their language as well.

Indian
Indians in Terengganu are mostly Tamils and the majority are adherents of Hinduism, although a minority follow Islam. Like their Chinese counterparts, the Indian community in Terengganu are highly assimilated, with many fluent in Terengganu Malay along with Tamil, Standard Malay and English. There is one major Hindu temple in Kuala Terengganu. Most Indians in Terengganu live in urban areas like Kuala Terengganu. A very small number of Malayalee community exist in Terengganu.

Siamese

The Siamese in Terengganu maintain a small but well-organised community. They can be found in Besut and few in Setiu and Kuala Terengganu. Physically, there is little difference between Malays and Siamese other than their name and religion. Their native language is Southern Thai language but most speak Kelantanese as large numbers of them live in Besut. One of the most well known Terengganuan Siamese is Siri Neng Buah, currently the president of the Malaysian Siamese Association.

Orang Asli
The Orang Aslis are the indigenous peoples of Peninsular Malaysia. In Terengganu they can be found mostly in Hulu Terengganu and Besut districts. There are two Orang Asli ethnic groups in Terengganu, the Semaq Beris lives near Lake Kenyir or other parts of the district, they belong to Senoi group. Besides the Semaq Beris, there are also Batek people, a Semang ethnic group mostly found in interior parts of Terengganu, especially in Taman Negara area or in other parts of Terengganu. Both Semaq Beris and Bateks still maintain their semi-nomadic lifestyle although some now lives in permanent homes. Both are also speakers of Austroasiatic languages.

Languages
The people of Terengganu generally speak Coastal Terengganu Malay, which is distinct from standard Malay and Kelantan-Pattani Malay, except for those in Besut district, Perhentian Islands and some parts of Setiu where Kelantanese are more dominant. Those that live in Hulu Terengganu had their own distinct variant but closely related to Coastal Terengganu Malay. Chinese Terengganuans are predominantly Hokkein and thus mostly speak Hokkien as their first language, although a number of Mandarin speakers are increasing. Indians in Terengganu mostly speak Malaysian Tamil. There is also an Orang Asli languages such as Batek and Semaq Beri, spoken in inland parts of Terengganu and is part of the Austroasiatic language family.

Religion

According to the 2010 Census, the population of Terengganu is 96.9% Muslim, 2.5% Buddhist, 0.2% Hindu, 0.2% Christian, and 0.2% follower of Chinese folk religions or unknown affiliation.

Statistics from the 2010 Census indicate that 91.4% of the Chinese population are identified as Buddhists, with significant minorities of adherents identifying as Christians (4.7%), Chinese folk religions (1.6%) and Muslims (1.4%). The majority of the Indian population are Hindus (69.8%), with a significant minorities of numbers identifying as Muslims (18.1%), Christians (5.3%) and Buddhists (4.9%). The non-Malay bumiputera community are predominantly Muslims (56.8%), with significant minorities identifying as Christians (33.2%) and Buddhists (5.6%). All Malays are Muslims.

Economy
Terengganu used to be Malaysia's poorest state until oil and gas were discovered off its coastline not too long ago. Terengganu's main industry now is petroleum and gas. There are huge petrochemical complexes near Paka and Kerteh, involving many joint ventures between the Malaysian national oil company, Petronas, and foreign multinationals. Tourism and fishing are also major industries in Terengganu, a state with a long coastline. Agriculture also remains important, with banana, rambutan, durian, watermelon, and various other fruits and vegetables available in season. Terengganu was traditionally famous for boatbuilding, with highly decorated carved wooden boats called bangau to be found in the harbour of every village and town in days not so long gone by, before electric motorboats became standard equipment for the state's fishermen.

Culture and attractions

Terengganu did not receive many Indian or Chinese migrants, and therefore Malay cultural influences predominate. Traditional pursuits such as kite-flying contests, top-spinning contests, and traditional arts & crafts, such as batik and songket are still very much alive. The people of Terengganu have always had a reputation for being socially conservative and devout Muslims.

The major tourist attractions in the state include: Kuala Terengganu, the capital; Islamic Heritage Park, Tasik Kenyir, a large artificial lake; Sekayu Waterfalls; Kuala Ibai Lagoons; Batu Burok Beach, Kemasik Beach, Rantau Abang, Setiu Wetlands, Marang, Chukai town and several offshore islands such as Pulau Redang, Pulau Lang Tengah, and Pulau Kapas, and the Pulau Perhentian, which attract beachgoers and snorkelers because of their picture perfect beaches. Many travellers find the relatively rural and tranquil atmosphere in the state conducive to a relaxing holiday.

Terengganu has recently been known internationally as the host of Monsoon Cup, which was first held in 2005 and then became an annual national sporting event. The event brought millions of ringgit of investment into the state from the private sectors and Malaysian Government. Tourists flocked to Kuala Terengganu and Duyong to witness this event, held during the monsoon season, which had previously been low season for tourism in Terengganu.

Culture 
Terengganu, along with Kelantan, is known as the cradle of the Malay civilization in Peninsular Malaysia. There are various traditional dances in the state such as the Ulek Mayang, Rodat, Saba, Balai, and Nur Sakti; some even predate the arrival of Islam in the region. Terengganu is also one of few states to adopt the gamelan as part of their traditional theatre (after Riau and Pahang); the Terengganu gamelan has developed a distinct identity from Sundanese and Javanese gamelan. The gamelan was originally brought to Pahang and later to Terengganu, and was played only during royal occasions. Today the gamelan is part of the state's cultural heritage.

Events 
 2008 National Horse Show at Terengganu Equestrian Resort 31 October to 2 November
 Monsoon Cup- international sailing event
 Sultan's Cup Terengganu Endurance Challenge - Horse Endurance Race
 Formula Future- speed boat racing for under 15
 Kapas-Marang International Swimathon- International swimming event
 Kenyir Motocross Championship
 Terengganu Masters- Golf
 Kenyir International Mountain Bike Challenge
 'Candat Sotong' Fiesta - fishing competition
 Kenyir Lake International Triathlon
 Terengganu Starhill Tasik Kenyir 4x4 Challenge
 Tasik Puteri Water Festival
 Terengganu Traditional Games Competition
 Terengganu International 4WD Rainforest Challenge 2007
 FEI World Endurance Championship 2008
 Le Tour de Langkawi 2012
 Terengganu International Squid Jigging Festival

Cuisine

The most famous local food is Keropok Lekor, which is made primarily from a combination of dough (sago flour) and pounded fish mainly from mackerel and sardines, fried and served with hot chilli sauce for afternoon tea. Keropok Keping (fish crackers) are made from sun-dried slices of Keropok Lekor. Numerous keropok stalls are to be found on the side of the highway that passes through coastal communities. Keropok lekor is best eaten with local chili sauce, made from dried chili, tamarind, sugar and vinegar.

Budu, a very pungent and salty anchovy sauce is also popular among the locals. It is often mixed with sliced onions and chillies as condiments. Budu made from ikan bilis fermented with salt. There are other version of budu, known as Pelara were made by using mackerel were popular among the older generation, can be found in traditional market sold in bottles.

Laksam (or laksang in Terengganu Malay), a modified version of laksa, is made from rice flour (thick and soft slices). It is served in a bowl of light fresh coconut milk mixed with boiled fish flesh (mainly mackerel), finely chopped cucumbers, chillies, onions and long beans. It is eaten cold at breakfast.

Another Terengganu speciality is sata, a type of otak-otak or fish cake wrapped in banana leaves and cooked over a grill. Sata made from combination of fish and grated coconut, with some portion of spice.

Nasi dagang is also popular.

Education

There are several institutes of higher learning in Terengganu. They are either categorised as Institut Pengajian Tinggi Awam (IPTA); public university or Institut Pengajian Tinggi Swasta (IPTS); private university. Among public universities which have campus in Terengganu is the Universiti Sultan Zainal Abidin and Universiti Malaysia Terengganu. Both universities have campus in Gong Badak, in north Kuala Terengganu.

Beside that, Terengganu also had 3 Universiti Teknologi MARA branches, in Kuala Terengganu, Dungun and Bukit Besi. Also, Terengganu host several private university and college, such as TATI University College in Kemaman, UCSI Terengganu campus in Marang, Institut Teknologi Petroleum PETRONAS (INSTEP) in Batu Rakit, Kuala Terengganu and Kolej Teknologi Bestari in Setiu, Politechnics Sultan Zainal Abidin, among others.

List of Tertiary Institutes (public and private)
Politeknik Kuala Terengganu
Universiti Sultan Zainal Abidin
Universiti Malaysia Terengganu
Universiti Teknologi MARA (3 branches)
Institut Teknologi Petroleum PETRONAS (INSTEP)
Politeknik Sultan Mizan Zainal Abidin
Kolej PTPL
Kolej Teknologi & Inovasi KRIM
Institut Teknologi Petronas
Kolej Seri Iman
Kolej Ketengah
RANACO Education and Training Institute (RETI)
Kolej Teras Timur
Kolej Islam Sains Teknologi (KIST)
TATI University College(TATIUC)
MARA KETENGAH International College (MKIC)

Secondary school (high school) education is provided by Sekolah Kebangsaan (National School, e.g.: Sekolah Kebangsaan Sultan Sulaiman), Sekolah Jenis Kebangsaan (National-type School) Chinese primary schools, and Sekolah Ugama (Religious schools, e.g.: SMA Sultan Zainal Abidin Ladang). All of them follow the syllabus and curriculum provided and regulated by the Malaysian Ministry of Education (Kementerian Pendidikan Malaysia). Every year the state government spends RM34 million to develop education in Terengganu. Part of these grants ensures that every eligible primary school student in Terengganu is able to get a Netbook worth RM1000 to help in their studies.

Transportation

Air
There are three airports located in Terengganu, of which two of them are open to the public. Sultan Mahmud Airport located in Gong Badak, Kuala Nerus is the state's main airport and serves as a main gateway by air to and from Terengganu. Other public airport is the Redang Airport, located in Redang Island off the coast of Terengganu.

Kerteh Airport, located in the town of Kerteh, Kemaman is the state's second largest airport but is not open to public because the airport is owned and operated by Petroliam Nasional Berhad or Petronas via its East Coast Regional Office (ECRO), and was built to serve the purpose of airlifting its employees and ExxonMobil employees to their various oil platforms located 100–200 km offshore South China Sea. The airport although small, has a single 1,362 m (4,469 ft) long runway which can accommodate a Boeing 737-400 aircraft.

A military air force base, RMAF Gong Kedak is located between the borders of Kelantan (Pasir Puteh) and Terengganu (Besut) and has an airstrip which crosses the two state borders.

Sister states

See also 
 Proclamation of Malaysia

In popular culture

Movies
Tukang Perahu Pulau Duyong (2013)

References

External links

Terengganu State Government Information Portal
Tourism Malaysia - Terengganu
Terengganu tourism page

 
States of Malaysia
Peninsular Malaysia
States and territories established in 1724
1724 establishments in Asia
British Malaya in World War II